The Kaukapakapa River is a river of New Zealand's North Island. It flows west, reaching the southernmost point of the Kaipara Harbour close to the town of Helensville.

See also
List of rivers of New Zealand

References

Rodney Local Board Area
Rivers of the Auckland Region
Kaipara Harbour catchment